Madeline Lee Green (born 20 October 1992) is a New Zealand cricketer who currently plays for Wellington and New Zealand. In April 2018, she won the Ruth Martin Cup for her domestic batting at the New Zealand Cricket Awards. On 8 June 2018, she scored her first century in WODIs, with 121 runs against Ireland.

In August 2018, she was awarded a central contract by New Zealand Cricket, following the tours of Ireland and England in the previous months. In October 2018, she was named in New Zealand's squad for the 2018 ICC Women's World Twenty20 tournament in the West Indies. In January 2020, she was named in New Zealand's squad for the 2020 ICC Women's T20 World Cup in Australia. In February 2022, she was named in New Zealand's team for the 2022 Women's Cricket World Cup in New Zealand. In June 2022, Green was named in New Zealand's team for the cricket tournament at the 2022 Commonwealth Games in Birmingham, England.

In April 2019, Green married New Zealand cricketer Liz Perry.

References

External links

 
 

1992 births
Living people
New Zealand women cricketers
New Zealand women One Day International cricketers
New Zealand women Twenty20 International cricketers
Cricketers from Auckland
New Zealand expatriate sportspeople in England
New Zealand expatriate sportspeople in Australia
New Zealand LGBT sportspeople
LGBT cricketers
Lesbian sportswomen
Auckland Hearts cricketers
Wellington Blaze cricketers
Nottinghamshire women cricketers
Welsh Fire cricketers
Brisbane Heat (WBBL) cricketers
Perth Scorchers (WBBL) cricketers
Cricketers at the 2022 Commonwealth Games
Commonwealth Games bronze medallists for New Zealand
Commonwealth Games medallists in cricket
Medallists at the 2022 Commonwealth Games